Nuit de Chien (This Night) is a 2008 French-German-Portuguese drama film directed by Werner Schroeter. It is based on the novel Para esta noche by  Juan Carlos Onetti. It was entered into the competition at the 65th Venice International Film Festival.

Cast
 Pascal Greggory as Ossorio
 Bruno Todeschini  as Morasan
 Amira Casar  as Irene
 Éric Caravaca  as Villar
 Nathalie Delon  as Risso
 Marc Barbe  as Vargas
 Jean-François Stévenin  as Martins
 Bulle Ogier  as D. Inês
 Laura Martin-Bassot (as Laura Martin)  as Victoria
 Filipe Duarte  as Júlio
 Sami Frey  as Barcala 
 Elsa Zylberstein as Maria de Souza
 Isabel Ruth
 Laura Soveral
 Teresa Tavares

References

External links

2008 films
2008 drama films
French drama films
2000s French-language films
Films directed by Werner Schroeter
German drama films
Portuguese drama films
2000s French films
2000s German films